Zardinellidae is an extinct taxonomic family of fossil sea snails, marine gastropod mollusks in the superfamily Acteonoidea.

References 

 The Taxonomicon

Acteonoidea
Gastropod families